Beasley Young Reece, Jr. (born March 18, 1954 in Waco, Texas) is a former American football defensive back in the National Football League for the Dallas Cowboys, New York Giants and Tampa Bay Buccaneers. He played college football at North Texas State University.

Early years
Reece attended La Vega High School, where he played as a cornerback. He walked-on at North Texas State University in the spring of 1972.

The next year he played part-time. As a junior, he became a starter at left cornerback and had 2 interceptions. As a senior he posted 2 interceptions.

Professional career

Dallas Cowboys
Reece was selected by the Dallas Cowboys in the ninth round (264th overall) of the 1976 NFL draft. The team drafted him as an athlete, so he spent his first weeks in training camp as a cornerback, before being switched to wide receiver. Playing against the New Orleans Saints  in week 2, he registered his only NFL reception, which went for 6 yards, but also fumbled on the play.

The next year he requested the opportunity to compete at cornerback. He was waived on September 12, 1977.

New York Giants
On September 14, 1977, the New York Giants claimed him off waivers to play as a defensive back. He became the starter at strong safety in 1978, before being switched to free safety in 1981.

In 1983, he asked for his release after rookie Terry Kinard was given the starting free safety position and he was cut on October 17.

Tampa Bay Buccaneers
The Tampa Bay Buccaneers claimed him off waivers on October 18, 1983. Despite playing only half of the season (8 starts), he registered 33 tackles, 5 passes defensed and led the team with 6 interceptions. The next year, he started 14 games at free safety, finishing with 70 tackles, 12 passes defensed, one interception and 7 special teams tackles. He was waived on September 2, 1985.

TV Broadcast
After his retirement from playing Reece worked as a color commentator and sideline reporter for NFL coverage on NBC and CBS, and served as an analyst for the 1992 Summer Olympics for NBC. During this time, he was the sports director for WVIT (NBC-30) in Hartford, Connecticut. He would also work in at WTOG Tampa Bay. When he came to CBS, he joined KYW-TV in Philadelphia, and became their Sports Director, a position he held from July 1998 to July 2015. Reece is an Eagle Scout and recipient of the Distinguished Eagle Scout Award.

In 2012, the Broadcast Pioneers of Philadelphia inducted Reece into its Hall of Fame.

On July 1, 2015, Reece was fired from KYW along with evening anchor Chris May and chief meteorologist Kathy Orr as a new general manager decided to take the Eyewitness News program in a different direction.

Personal life
Reese and his wife Paula have been married since 1978. They have two children. Reese is an avid classical piano player and is a member of the Alpha Phi Alpha fraternity. He is a cousin of former NFL players Greg Pruitt and Randy Logan.

References

External links
Beasley Reece, So many stories to tell

1954 births
Living people
Sportspeople from Waco, Texas
Players of American football from Texas
African-American players of American football
American football cornerbacks
American television sports announcers
Dallas Cowboys players
National Football League announcers
College football announcers
New York Giants players
North Texas Mean Green football players
Olympic Games broadcasters
Television anchors from Philadelphia
Philadelphia television reporters
Tampa Bay Buccaneers announcers
Tampa Bay Buccaneers players
Notre Dame Fighting Irish football announcers
Waco High School alumni
21st-century African-American people
20th-century African-American sportspeople